Ethasor Raphael Akpejiori is a Nigerian professional boxer.

Early life
Ethasor Raphael Akpejiori was born on 10 October 1990 in Lagos, Nigeria, and grew up in the Surulere area of the city. He has five siblings. In 2008, at the age of 17, he moved to Wichita, Kansas, on a basketball scholarship, where he attended Sunrise Christian Academy. In 2010, he moved to Miami, Florida, after being recruited by the University of Miami basketball team, eventually switching to play American football and gaining a place at the Miami Dolphins' rookie training camp. He holds a bachelors and master's degree in mechanical engineering.

Amateur career
Akpejiori had a brief amateur, compiling a record of 13–1 (10 KOs). He has been invited by the Nigerian Boxing Federation to compete for Nigeria at the Tokyo Olympics as a super-heavyweight.

Professional career
Promoted by CES Boxing and trained by former world champion Glen Johnson, Akpejiori made his professional debut on 14 September 2018, scoring a first-round technical knockout (TKO) victory over Omar Acosta at the Twin River Event Center in Lincoln, Rhode Island. Following another first-round TKO win over James Advincola in November, Akpejiori scored three more first-round stoppage wins in 2019; a knockout (KO) over Leo Cassiani in June; and TKOs over Johan Lopez in July and Jose Pulido in August. Akpejiori's first fight of 2020 was a second-round TKO win against Mike Ford in January.

Professional boxing record

References

Living people
Year of birth missing (living people)
Date of birth missing (living people)
Nigerian male boxers
Sportspeople from Lagos
Heavyweight boxers